Veliša Mugoša (14 April 1931 – 14 April 1979) was a Yugoslav long-distance runner. He competed in the men's 5000 metres at the 1956 Summer Olympics. He finished in second place in the men's 5000 meters at the 1957 World University Games.

Running career
Mugoša ran as a youth in the place of his birth, Lješkopolje, a rural part of the Donja Gorica suburb in present-day Podgorica. In 1949, Mugoša was the winner of a state junior 1500 meter race for high schoolers in Varaždin. After graduating from high school, he trained in several track clubs over a shorter period of time, including Budućnost, Olimpija Ljubljana, Mladost Zagreb, and AK Partizan. After that, he moved to AK Crvena Zvezda, where he trained until the end of his career. In Belgrade, he was a geography and philosophy student at the University of Belgrade while he recorded Yugoslavia's leading results in the 1500, 3000, and 5000 meters. On 1 July 1956, he ran a personal best time of 13:58.8 in a 5000-meter race in Belgrade, becoming the first person from Yugoslavia to ever run the distance under 14 minutes. At the 1956 Summer Olympics, he progressed to the men's 5000 meter final but dropped out of the race after going out at world record pace. 

In the late 1950s, he traveled to the United States where he ran several indoor races. On 1 February 1958, in front of an audience of 12,445 at Boston Garden, Mugoša finished the indoor 2-mile at the Boston AA Games in second place behind Deacon Jones, who won in 9:01.1. On 22 February 1958, he won the men's indoor 3-mile at the AAU Indoor Championships in a time of 13:54.2.

References

1931 births
1979 deaths
Sportspeople from Podgorica
Yugoslav male middle-distance runners
Yugoslav male long-distance runners
Montenegrin male middle-distance runners
Montenegrin male long-distance runners
Olympic athletes of Yugoslavia
Athletes (track and field) at the 1956 Summer Olympics
USA Indoor Track and Field Championships winners